Berry Kroeger (October 16, 1912 – January 4, 1991) was an American film, television and stage actor.

Career 
Kroeger was born in  San Antonio, Texas. He got his acting start on radio as an announcer on Suspense and as an actor, playing for a time The Falcon in the radio series Also on radio, he portrayed Dr. Reed Bannister on Big Sister, narrated Salute to Youth, and was a regular as Sam Williams on Young Doctor Malone.

Kroeger made his Broadway debut on December 6, 1943, at the Royale Theatre as Miley in Nunnally Johnson's The World's Full of Girls, which was adapted from Thomas Bell's 1943 novel Till I Come Back to You. He went on to appear in Reclining Figure (1954), Julius Caesar (1950), and The Tempest (1944). He portrayed the High Lama in the 1956 musical adaptation of Lost Horizon titled Shangri-La.

Kroeger was discovered by filmmaker William Wellman while performing on Broadway and began appearing in films with his role in The Iron Curtain (1948). He specialized in playing slimy bad guys in films like Act of Violence (1948), The Iron Curtain (1948), a crooked lawyer in Cry of the City (1948) and a heavy in Joseph H. Lewis' crime film, Gun Crazy (1949).

His flair for decadent leering and evil scowls often led to his being cast in "schlock fare", like Chamber of Horrors (1966) and The Incredible 2-Headed Transplant (1971). He appeared in a small role as a village elder in Young Frankenstein (1974). He also appeared in dozens of television programs. He guest starred on seven episodes of Perry Mason as well as in episodes of The Rifleman, Hawaiian Eye, Get Smart (as a character spoofing actor Sydney Greenstreet) and The Man from U.N.C.L.E.. His last major film role was in 1977's The Demon Seed (1977).

Death 
Kroeger died  on January 4, 1991, of kidney failure at Cedars-Sinai Medical Center in Los Angeles.

Filmography

References
 
Turner Classic Movies

External links
 
 

1912 births
1991 deaths
American male film actors
American male stage actors
American male radio actors
American male television actors
Male actors from San Antonio
Deaths from kidney failure
20th-century American male actors